Anyieka is a settlement in Kenya's Siaya County.

History 
Before the Kenyan general election in 2013, Anyieka voted as part of the Nyanza Province.

References 

Populated places in Nyanza Province